The Raptor 1NT overcall over an opposing 1-level suit opening is a contract bridge convention that indicates a two-suited hand with exactly four cards in the unbid major and a longer suit in an unbid minor.

The idea of utilising a 1NT overcall to denote a 5-4 two suiter seems to have originated independently in Sweden and Poland in the early 1980s. The name, however, comes from Ron Sutherland and his son who re-invented this approach and published it in a Toronto magazine in 1993 under the acronym "wRAP around TORonto" style.

When playing Raptor, an overcall of 1NT shows a 4 card major and a longer (5+) card minor. One of these suits will be known. For example:
(1) – 1NT shows 5+ diamonds and a 4 card major.
(1) – 1NT shows 4 spades and a 5 card minor.

Strength is a matter for partnership agreement. Compared with a natural 2-level overcall, the Raptor 1NT may be safe with fewer points, as it promises two places to play, and it may have a wider range, as it is forcing.

Followups:
 A bid of the known suit is to play.
 If the major suit is known, then advancer's cue bid shows a limit raise of the major (or better)
 If the major suit is unknown, then advancer's cue bid requests that opener bid his major, and may be weak.
 If the minor suit is unknown, 2 asks overcaller to pass (with clubs) or correct to 2.
 Other bids tend to show values in the suit, and suggest it as trump even if the overcaller is short.

See also
Unusual notrump
Michaels cuebid
Ghestem
Takeout double

References

Bridge conventions

ru:Конвенция (бридж)#Конвенция «Раптор»